There have been a number of Jews to take up the position of governor of one of the states or Governor-General of Australia. This role is as the representative of the monarch in Australia.

See also 
* List of Jewish members of Australian parliaments

References 

Governors
Governors
Jewish
Jewish